God: The Failed Hypothesis is a 2007 non-fiction book by scientist Victor J. Stenger who argues that there is no evidence for the existence of a deity and that God's existence, while not impossible, is improbable.

Synopsis
Stenger writes that when Stephen Jay Gould said religion was outside the reach of science, he was reducing religion to moral philosophy. In contrast, Stenger believes that religion often makes claims that are very much within the abilities of science to investigate. In that vein, he says that science practices methodological naturalism, although it does not rule out the supernatural (i.e. metaphysical naturalism or physicalism), science does restrict itself to testing that which can actually be tested – namely effects in the natural world (be their cause natural or supernatural).

Stenger believes we have more than enough evidence of absence of the Judeo-Christian God. He adds that many arguments for God that were once compelling are now weak or irrelevant in light of modern scientific understanding. Stenger does not think we should be dogmatic about disbelief in God, but says the evidence is overwhelmingly against the belief. He is also critical of fine-tuning and fine-tuned universe arguments, and says they misunderstand the more reasonable weak anthropic principle.

Critique
David Ludden of Skeptic magazine wrote that "Stenger lays out the evidence from cosmology, astrophysics, nuclear physics, particle physics, statistical mechanics and quantum mechanics showing that the universe appears exactly as it should if there is no creator." Ludden concluded "All freethinkers should have both volumes [The God Delusion and God: The Failed Hypothesis], side by side, on their bookshelves."

Damien Broderick wrote in The Australian, "Stenger offers an answer to that deep question in his two new books, arguing a materialist, God-free account of the cosmos, equally antagonistic to superstition, to the paranormal and to religions archetypal and newfangled alike. He refuses to accept the polite accommodation urged by agnostic Stephen Jay Gould that science and religion can never be in conflict as they are non-overlapping 'magisteria'."

See also
 Omnipotence paradox
 Problem of evil
 Teleological argument#Fine-tuned universe

References

Further reading
 Carlson, Elof Axel. (September 2007). "The Resurrection of Atheism". Quarterly Review of Biology. 82(3): 256–58. 
 Flynn, Tom. (2007). "Tour De Force". Free Inquiry. 27(3): 57–58. .
 Hey, John. (April/May 2007). "God, The Failed Hypothesis: How Science Shows That God Does Not Exist". Implicit Religion. 10(3): 311–313. .
 Lachmann, P. J. (2009). "God: 'To Be or Not to Be; That Is Not the Question'". American Journal of Psychology. 122(2): 272–278.

External links
 Description from Prometheus Books
 A summary of God: The Failed Hypothesis from Stenger

2007 non-fiction books
Books critical of religion
Books about atheism
New Atheism
Religious studies books
Prometheus Books books
2007 in religion